A marina (from Spanish , Portuguese  and Italian : marina, "coast" or "shore") is a dock or basin with moorings and supplies for yachts and small boats.
A marina differs from a port in that a marina does not handle large passenger ships or cargo from freighters.

The word marina may also refer to an inland wharf on a river or canal that is used exclusively by non-industrial pleasure craft such as canal narrowboats.

Emplacement

Marinas may be located along the banks of rivers connecting to lakes or seas and may be inland.
They are also located on coastal harbors (natural or man made) or coastal lagoons, either as stand alone facilities or within a port complex.

History
In the 19th century, the few existing pleasure craft shared the same facilities as trading and fishing vessels. The marina appeared in the 20th century with the popularization of yachting.

Facilities and services
A marina may have refuelling, washing and repair facilities, marine and boat chandlers, stores and restaurants.
A marina may include ground facilities such as parking lots for vehicles and boat trailers. Slipways (or boat ramps) transfer a trailered boat into the water.
A marina may have a travel lift, a specialised crane used for lifting heavier boats out of the water and transporting them around the hard stand. A marina may provide in- or out-of-water boat storage.

Fee-based services such as parking, use of picnic areas, pubs, and clubhouses for showers are usually included in long-term rental agreements. Visiting yachtsmen usually have the option of buying each amenity from a fixed schedule of fees; arrangements can be as wide as a single use, such as a shower, or several weeks of temporary berthing. The right to use the facilities is frequently extended at overnight or period rates to visiting yachtsmen.
Since marinas are often limited by available space, it may take years on a waiting list to get a permanent berth.

Moorings and access

Boats are moored on buoys, on fixed or floating walkways tied to an anchoring piling by a roller or ring mechanism (floating docks, pontoons).
Buoys are cheaper to rent but less convenient than being able to walk from land to boat. Harbor shuttles (water taxis) or launches, may transfer people between the shore and boats moored on buoys.
The alternative is a tender such as an inflatable boat. Facilities offering fuel, boat ramps and stores will normally have a common-use dock set aside for such short term parking needs.

Where the tidal range is large, marinas may use locks to maintain the water level for several hours before and after low water.

Economic organisation

Marinas may be owned and operated by a private club, especially yacht clubs — but also as private enterprises or municipal facilities. Marinas may be standalone private businesses, components of a resort, or owned and operated by public entities.

See also
List of marinas

References

External links

 
Nautical terminology